The three-toed swiftlet or Papuan swiftlet (Aerodramus papuensis, formerly Collocalia papuensis) is a species of swift. It is found in New Guinea.

References

three-toed swiftlet
Birds of New Guinea
three-toed swiftlet
three-toed swiftlet
Taxonomy articles created by Polbot